Kahn-e Jan Mohammad (also Romanized as Kahn-e Jān Moḩammad) is a village in Birk Rural District, in the Central District of Mehrestan County, Sistan and Baluchestan Province, Iran. At the 2006 census, its population was 372, in 74 families.

References 

Populated places in Mehrestan County